Florendo M. Visitacion (11 June 1910 – 4 January 1999) was a martial arts instructor. Visitacion, commonly called 'Professor Vee', was born in Ilocos Norte, Philippines in 1910. He began informal Filipino Martial Arts training with his brother and uncle at the age of ten. In 1928, he moved to Stockton, California where he studied Filipino martial arts from available sources.

Vee Jitsu
On September 5, 1955, he introduced Vee Jitsu.  before that Visitacion went on a personal journey where he devoted many years to the study of different fighting styles. After studying several styles he realized that mastery of a particular system was not always necessary, what was essential was the ability to understand its useful principles and how to apply them effectively in a given situation.

Teaching 
Visitacion began his career as a martial arts instructor during the mid-1950s and for over three decades, he actively taught his art at different locations throughout the New York metropolitan area.

As his style evolved, so did its name, at one point he renamed it Vee Jitsu, Vee Jitsu Te, and the final art he presented for recognition among his peers was Visitacion Kuntao.

References

External links
 http://www.VisitacionKuntao.com

American eskrimadors
Filipino eskrimadors
1910 births
1999 deaths
People from Ilocos Norte